Ethel Ellen "Kitty" Mackay (later Hodgson, 5 June 1915 – 25 June 1974) was an Australian swimmer. She competed in the 100 m freestyle and 100 m backstroke events at the 1936 Summer Olympics, but failed to reach the finals.

References

1915 births
1974 deaths
Olympic swimmers of Australia
Swimmers at the 1936 Summer Olympics
Australian female freestyle swimmers
Female backstroke swimmers